Catey may refer to:

 Catey Hill, editor, New York Daily News
 Catey Hill, broadcaster for WJBR-FM from 10 AM to 2 PM on weekdays
 Samaná El Catey International Airport, airport under construction in the Dominican Republic
 An award given at The Catey Awards, a UK award ceremony for the hotel and catering industry